Durham County is a Canadian crime drama television series produced by Muse Entertainment and Back Alley Films. It starred Hugh Dillon as Mike Sweeney, a homicide detective who finds that moving back home comes with trouble and danger. Dillon appeared in this series at the same time he appeared in an ongoing role in another series, Flashpoint.

Premise
The series stars Hugh Dillon as Mike Sweeney, a homicide detective from Toronto, who moves his family to suburban Durham County, to start over after his partner was killed and his wife Audrey (Hélène Joy) diagnosed with breast cancer. However, he soon discovers that his neighbour, and childhood nemesis, Ray Prager (Justin Louis) may be a serial killer.

Set amidst the landscape of a newer suburban development, the mise-en-scène conveys a palpable sense of alienation, like being cut off from the rest of the world. With shiny hydro towers looming on the skyline, everything appears without history, and homogeneity pervades the neighbourhoods. In this setting, we deal with the aftermath of a serial killer's impact on his family, his surviving victims, and their families. The question is how do the families move on after being so traumatized by the heinous acts of a killer.

Airings
The series premiered on Movie Central and The Movie Network on May 7, 2007. After more than a year, the second season premiered on July 13, 2009. The third and final season debuted on October 25, 2010. The first season subsequently aired on Global in the 2007–2008 television season. In Canada, the first season was released on DVD on September 9, 2008, followed by the second season on July 27, 2010.

On September 7, 2009, the series began airing on Ion Television, which reaches more than 94 million US television households. The network secured all US television, digital media rights, Internet streaming and video-on-demand rights for the program. It is the first original series to air on the network since 2004.

Cast and characters

Main
 Hugh Dillon as Mike Sweeney, a veteran homicide detective having difficulty coming to terms with his past, tries starting afresh by quitting his old position after the murder of his professional partner, and relocating his family back to his hometown.  However, he soon realizes he cannot escape his past demons.  In trying to cope with his wife's recent cancer diagnosis, he seeks solace with a grieving teacher he meets in a support group.
 Hélène Joy as Audrey Sweeney is the emotionally starved wife of Mike Sweeney, trying to cope with her recent diagnosis of breast cancer.
 Sonya Salomaa as Traci Prager (season 1)
 Laurence Leboeuf as Sadie Sweeney
 Greyston Holt as Ray Prager Jr., the self-conscious teenage son of Ray Prager Sr., struggling to find his place despite his overbearing parents, and feeling caught in the middle of his parents' disintegrating relationship. He seems oblivious to his father's shady interests and is often silent about his personal aspirations.
 Justin Louis as Ray Prager (season 1)
 Patrick Labbé as Tom Bykovski (season 2; recurring season 1)
 Michelle Forbes as Penelope Verrity (season 2)
 Michael Nardone as Ivan Sujic (season 3)

Recurring
 Jean-Nicolas Verreault as Jayson Graves Big Guy (season 1)
 Kathleen Munroe as Nathalie Lacroix (season 1)
 Joel Keller as Jake Sharpe (seasons 1–2)
 Claudia Ferri as Roxy Calvert (seasons 1–2)
 Cicely Austin as Maddie Sweeney
 Michael Dopud as Glenn Stuckey (season 2)
 Romano Orzari as Ray Prager (season 2)
 Geordie Johnson as Jonathan Verrity (season 2)
 Alex Cardillo as Mark Verrity (season 2)
 Christine Ghawi as Elodie Belknap (season 2)
 Krista Bridges as Sabina Leung (season 3)
 Andreas Apergis as Miro Çercu (season 3)
 Bénédicte Décary as Eva Arcady (season 3)
 Shannon Kook-Chun as David Cho (season 3)
 Gord Rand as Dr. Campbell Chin

Guest
 Danny Blanco Hall as Caleb (season 1)

Episodes

Series overview

Season 1 (2007)

Season 2 (2009)

Season 3 (2010)

Distribution
All three seasons of Durham County are distributed in Canada by Muse Distribution International and internationally by ITV Global.

All three seasons were filmed in and around Montreal, Quebec.

DVD releases
Anchor Bay Entertainment has released the first two seasons on DVD in Canada only. The third season will be released on February 21, 2012.

In addition to the DVD releases, all three seasons became available in Canada in the iTunes Store on August 1, 2011.

Well Go USA released the first season on DVD in the US. Season 2 was released on November 23, 2010.

Awards and nominations

Season 1
 Gemini Awards
Best Writing in a Dramatic Series
Best Direction in a Dramatic Series
Best Performance by an Actor in a Continuing Leading Dramatic Role
Best Performance by an Actress in a Continuing Leading Dramatic Role
Best Sound in a Dramatic Series
 Gemini Nominations
Best Dramatic Series
Best Photography in a Dramatic Program
Best Picture Editing in a Dramatic Program
Best Costume Design
Best Achievement in Casting
Best Performance by an Actress in a Supporting Series
Best Performance by an Actor in a Continuing Leading Role
 Directors Guild of Canada
 Nominations
Best Editing – Dramatic Series 
Best Direction – Television Series
 Canadian Film and Television Production Association (CFTPA)
Indie Award - Best Dramatic Series
 2008 WorldFest – Houston International Film Festival
Winner of Gold Award
Best TV Series - Dramatic
 Directors Guild of Canada Award Nominations
Team Television Series – Drama 
Production Design – Television Series
 Writers Guild of Canada Award Nomination
Best Writing in a Dramatic Series
 Alliance of Canadian Cinema, Television and Radio Artists
Montreal Awards Nominations
Outstanding Female Performance
Outstanding Male Performance
 Leo Awards Nomination
Best Supporting Performance by a Female in a Dramatic Series
Best Supporting Performance by a Male in a Dramatic Series

Season 2
 Gemini Awards
Best Achievement in Main Title Design - Kevin Chandoo
Best Achievement in Make-Up - Eva Coudouloux and Adrien Morot
 Gemini Nominations
Best Dramatic Series
Best Direction in a Dramatic Series - Adrienne Mitchell
Best Performance by an Actress in a Continuing Leading Dramatic Role - Helene Joy
Best Achievement in Casting - Andrea Kenyon, Wendy O'Brien, Marissa Richmond, and Randi Wells
 Monte-Carlo Television Festival
Winner of 2010 Golden Nymph Award
Outstanding Actress- Michelle Forbes (Drama TV Series)
 Monte-Carlo Television Festival Nominations
Outstanding Actor – Hugh Dillon (Drama TV Series)
Outstanding International Producer – Janis Lundman, Adrienne Mitchell, Laurie Finstad Knizhnik and Michael Prupas (Drama TV Series)
 Directors Guild of Canada Award Winners
Best Direction- TV Series - Adrienne Mitchell
Best Production Design- TV Series - Donna Noonan
 Directors Guild of Canada Award Nominee
Best Picture Editing- TV Series
 EMPixx Awards
Platinum Award for Best National Cable Program in the Entertainment Category
 WorldFest – Houston International Film Festival 
Winner of the Platinum Award - Best TV Series – Drama

Season 3
Gemini Award Wins
 Best Achievement in Casting - Marissa Richmond, Libby Goldstein, Andrea Kenyon, Suzanne Smith, Randi Wells
 Gemini Award Nominations
 Best Direction in a Dramatic Series - Charles Biname
 Best Sound in a Dramatic Series - Steve Moore, Alex Bullick, Yann Cleary, Christian Cooke, Andrea Higgins, Jill Purdy, Marilee Yorston
 Best Performance by an Actor in a Continuing Lead Dramatic Role - Hugh Dillon
 Best Performance by an Actor in a Guest Role, Dramatic Series - Michael Nardone
 Best Performance by an Actress in Featured Supporting Role in a Dramatic Series - Benedicte Decary
 Directors Guild of Canada Award Nominations
 Best Direction - Television Series - Adrienne Mitchell
 Best Sound Editing - Television Series - Jill Purdy, Alex Bullick, Rose Gregoris
 2011 EMPixx Awards
 Platinum Award - Entertainment Category - Janis Lundman, Adrienne Mitchell, Michael Prupas and Laurie Finstad Knizhnik
 Platinum Award - Writing - Laurie Finstad Knizhnik
 Platinum Award - Art Direction and Set Design - Donna Noonan
 Platinum Award - Cinematography - Eric Cayla
 Platinum Award - Editing - Teresa De Luca
 Platinum Award - Editing - Michele Conroy
 Platinum Award - Directing - Adrienne Mitchell
 Platinum Award - Music Composition - Peter Chapman
2011 WorldFest-Houston Remi Awards
 Winner of a Gold 2011 Worldfest Remi Award in the category of TV Series - Dramatic.
WorldFest-Houston International Film Festival 2011''
 Nominated for 5 awards including: Outstanding International Producers (Janis Lundman, Adrienne Mitchell, Michael Prupas), Outstanding Actor (Hugh Dillon, Michael Nardone) and Outstanding Actress (Hélène Joy, Laurence Leboeuf).Remi Award Nominations Nominated for a 2011 Worldfest Remi Award in the category of TV Series - Dramatic.Interactive Media 2010 Award Best in Class - Television in recognition of Durham County - Season 3 Website www.durhamcounty.ca
 WGC Screenwriting Award'''
 Script for "Distance, Hunting and Home", written by Laurie Finstad Knizhnik, was chosen as a finalist

Notes

References

External links

 
 

2000s Canadian crime drama television series
2010s Canadian crime drama television series
2007 Canadian television series debuts
2010 Canadian television series endings
Crave original programming
Television series about cancer
Television series by Muse Entertainment
Television shows set in Ontario